WJEJ is a Full Service formatted broadcast radio station featuring Adult Standards, Middle of the Road and Oldies music, broadcasting on 1240 AM and on 104.3 FM via translator W282CR.  WJEJ is licensed to Hagerstown, Maryland, serving Hagerstown and Eastern Washington County, Maryland.  WJEJ is owned and operated by Hagerstown Broadcasting Company.

References

External links

WJEJ Online

1932 establishments in Maryland
Adult standards radio stations in the United States
Full service radio stations in the United States
Oldies radio stations in the United States
Radio stations established in 1932
JEJ